Qaghan or Khagan is a title of imperial rank in the Turkic and Mongolian languages equal to the status of emperor and someone who rules a khaganate (empire).

Qaghan may refer to:

Bumin Qaghan (a.k.a. Bumın Kagan) or Illig Qaghan, (died 552 AD), the founder of the Turkic Khaganate
Issik Qaghan, the second ruler of the Turkic Khaganate (552-553)
Muqan Qaghan, the second son of Bumin Qaghan and the third khagan of the Göktürks. Ruled 553 – 572
Taspar Qaghan or Tatpar Qaghan, the third son of Bumin Qaghan and Wei Changle, and the fourth khagan of the Turkic Khaganate (572–581)
Ishbara Qaghan (before 540 – 587), the first son of Issik Qaghan, grandson of Bumin Qaghan, and the sixth khagan of the Turkic Khaganate (581–587)
Apa Qaghan, son of Muqan Qaghan, declared himself qaghan of the Turkic Khaganate and reigned: 581–587 
Bagha Qaghan, the seventh ruler of the Turkic Kaganate (587–589)
Niri Qaghan, ruler of the Western Turkic Khaganate (587-599)
Heshana Qaghan (died 619), a khagan of Western Turkic Khaganate (604-612)
Yami Qaghan (?–609), personal name Ashina Jankan, a khagan of Eastern Turkic Khaganate, known in some point as Tolis Qaghan
Tong Yabghu Qaghan was khagan of the Western Turkic Khaganate from 618 to 628
Illig Qaghan, later Tang posthumous title Prince Huang of Guiyi, the last qaghan of the Eastern Turkic Khaganate
Tolis Qaghan (603–631), personal name Ashina Shibobi, son of Shibi Qaghan, a khagan of Eastern Turkic Khaganate when the khaganate was defeated and became a vassal of Tang dynasty.
Ilterish Qaghan (died 692) was the founder of the Second Turkic Khaganate (reigning 682–692)
Qapaghan Qaghan (664-716) or Qapghan Qaghan, the second Khaghan of the Second Turkic Khaganate during Wu Zetian's reign and was the younger brother of the first kaghan, Ilterish Qaghan
Inel Qaghan or Inel Khagan, a ruler of the Second Turkic Khaganate (716)

Kaghan
Bilge Khagan (683–734), the khagan of the Second Turkic Khaganate (717–734)
Oghuz Khagan or Oghuz Khan, a legendary and semi-mythological khan of the Turks

See also
Qaghans of the Turkic khaganates
Khagan Bek, the title used by the bek (generalissimo) of the Khazars